The 1940 Kentucky Wildcats football team was an American football team that represented the University of Kentucky as a member of the Southeastern Conference (SEC) during the 1940 college football season. In their third season under head coach Albert D. Kirwan, the Wildcats compiled an overall record of 5–3–2 with a mark of 1–2–2 against conference opponents, finished in ninth place in the SEC, and outscored opponents by a total of 190 to 107.

Schedule

References

Kentucky
Kentucky Wildcats football seasons
Kentucky Wildcats football